Hilda Furacão (English: Hilda Hurricane) is a 1998 Brazilian miniseries written by Glória Perez, based on Roberto Drummond's book, starring Ana Paula Arósio in the title role.

Plot 
The most sought-after prostitute in the Belo Horizonte, Minas Gerais, brothels during the 50s and 60s, Hilda Müller (Ana Paula Arósio) was the daughter of a highly respected middle-class family. She scandalized society by breaking away from her family and shattering taboos, fleeing on her wedding day and seeking refuge in a brothel and adopting the alias Hilda Furacão. The miniseries contrasts antagonistic contexts (religiosity and profligacy behavior; revolution and counter-revolution), as well as, with antagonistic characters (Hilda Furacão and Frei Malthus (Rodrigo Santoro)). The series ends during the 60s, after the 1964 Brazilian coup d'etat.

Cast

References

External links 
 

Brazilian television miniseries
TV Globo telenovelas
1998 Brazilian television series debuts
1998 Brazilian television series endings
Telenovelas by Glória Perez
Culture in Minas Gerais